Warrack is a surname. Notable people with the surname include:

Allan Warrack (born 1937), Canadian politician
Grace Harriet Warrack (1855–1932), Scottish editor and translator
Guy Warrack (1900–1986), Scottish composer and conductor
Harriet Warrack (–1910), Scottish school founder and headmistress 
John Warrack (born 1928), English music critic and oboist